Parrish may refer to:

Places in the United States
 Parrish, Alabama
 Parrish, Florida
 Parrish, Illinois, a town destroyed in 1925 by the infamous Tri-State Tornado
 Parrish, Wisconsin, a town
 Parrish (community), Wisconsin, an unincorporated community
 Parrish Creek, a stream in Utah
 Parrish, Oregon

Other uses
 Parrish (surname), for people with surname Parrish
 Parrish "PMD" Smith, American rapper
 Parrish (novel), a 1958 novel written by Mildred Savage
 Parrish (film), a 1961 film starring Troy Donahue based on the 1958 novel
 Parrish Art Museum, Long Island, New York

See also
 Parish (disambiguation)